is a Japanese serial killer and rapist. He is also known as the "Twitter Killer", which he was labeled as in most media reports at the time of his sentencing. In Zama, Japan, between August and October 2017, he murdered nine people, mostly young women including three high school girls.

Background
Takahiro Shiraishi was living in an apartment in Zama, a city in central Kanagawa Prefecture. Reportedly, he stalked Twitter and contacted suicidal people asking them to come to his house so he could watch them commit suicide. He offered to either assist, or watch them kill themselves. A friend of his indicated that he had indulged in choking games with school friends, and signs of his later victims indicated that they had been strangled to death.

Before his move to Zama, Shiraishi had worked as a scout who lures women into brothels to work in the sex industry in Kabukicho, Tokyo's biggest red-light district. At this stage, people had started warning locals about him, describing him as a "creepy scout". Shiraishi then moved from Tokyo into an apartment in Zama in August 2017.

Investigation and arrest

One of the missing women's brothers started an investigation on his own to find his sister. A woman assisted him by contacting Shiraishi, and setting up a fake appointment. They both involved the police.

The police then arrived at the apartment and asked where the missing woman was. Shiraishi indicated she was in the freezer. Police found nine dead bodies in the house, all of which had been dismembered. In three cooler boxes and five large storage boxes, police found heads, legs and arms from his victims. Neighbors corroborated the events by confirming that foul smells of rotting flesh had come from the house. Shiraishi had discarded elements of the people into his bin, which had been taken away in the recycled rubbish. The nine victims were eight women and one man, all of whom were between the ages of 15-26. 

Police investigation had confirmed the missing woman had been walking with Shiraishi on 23 October.

Shiraishi confessed to killing and dismembering the nine people. Before he committed the murders, Shiraishi had told his father his life had no meaning.

Shiraishi claimed his motive was sex. He wanted to use his victims’ vulnerable states to manipulate and sexually assault them, fulfilling his fantasies and not having to worry about them denying his advances.

On 1 October 2020, Shiraishi pled guilty to nine murders, and on 15 December 2020, he was sentenced to death. He has indicated he will not appeal his sentence.

Shiraishi's death sentence was finalised in January 2021, and he is currently awaiting execution.

See also
List of serial killers by country

References 

1990 births
2017 murders in Japan
21st-century Japanese criminals
Japanese male criminals
Japanese prisoners sentenced to death
Japanese serial killers
Living people
Male serial killers
November 2017 crimes in Asia
People from Zama, Kanagawa
Prisoners sentenced to death by Japan
Twitter